MALP may refer to:

 Makrakomi Archaeological Landscapes Project, around the village of Makrakomi in Greece 2010–2015
 Miniature Air Launched Payload (MALP), a miniature UAV
 Mexican American Library Program (MALP), at the Benson Latin American Collection, University of Texas